Ruth Pelke was a 78-year-old American from Gary, Indiana, who was murdered by Paula R. Cooper (August 25, 1969 – May 26, 2015), aged 15, on May 14, 1985. Cooper stabbed Pelke 33 times with a butcher knife before stealing ten dollars and her car. A year later, Cooper was sentenced to death on July 11, 1986.

Cooper's age and sentence attracted an international uproar, especially in Europe, including a condemnation from Pope John Paul II. In 1989, her sentence was commuted to 60 years in prison. On June 17, 2013, Cooper was released from Rockville Correctional Facility. She died on May 26, 2015, following an apparent suicide.

Background
According to police, Cooper skipped school with three friends (Denise Thomas, aged 14; Karen Corder, aged 16; and April Beverly, aged 15), drank alcohol, and smoked marijuana before visiting Pelke, a neighbor, ostensibly to ask about Bible lessons. One of the girls struck Pelke with a vase, and cut her arms and legs. Cooper stabbed Pelke 33 times in the chest and stomach with a foot-long (30 cm) butcher knife. Cooper and her friends then searched the house for jewelry, and stole ten dollars and the keys to Pelke's 1976 Plymouth.

Cooper's lawyers described her as a victim of sexual abuse who had attended ten different schools by the time of the murder. She had a prior record as a runaway and for burglary. However, there was little question of her guilt in the case. She was considered to be the ringleader of the group of girls, aged 14 to 16, who were all given sentences of 25 to 60 years for their roles in the crime. According to authorities, Cooper attacked guards in the juvenile center after her arrest and had to be moved to the County Jail. There, it was reported that she bragged about her crime and had said she would do it again.

Sentencing and fallout
Cooper's public defender advised her to plead guilty. At sentencing, Lake County prosecutor James McNew portrayed Cooper as a social misfit with no hope of rehabilitation and asked for the death penalty. The defense presented evidence that Cooper was a chronic runaway who had been physically abused and forced to watch the rape of her mother and violent assaults by her father. The defense stated that Cooper's mother had once attempted to kill her. Cooper was found guilty, and Judge James Kimbrough imposed the death penalty.

Cooper was sent to Death Row at Indiana Women's Prison in Indianapolis. Her case was taken up by attorney Monica Foster, who organized a campaign which presented an appeal signed by two million people to the Indiana Supreme Court. Pope John Paul II made a personal appeal to Indiana Governor Robert Orr in September 1987. A separate appeal to the United Nations received one million signatures.

Cooper's case was profiled on 60 Minutes and various European television programs. She was front-page news in her hometown of Gary, including a scandal where it was found that several prison guards had sex with her in her cell, and pregnancy tests were performed, which came back negative. Judge Kimbrough died, and the appeals process was slowed as a replacement was chosen. In 1987, the Indiana legislature passed a bill raising the minimum age for a defendant in a death penalty case from 10 years old to 16 years old. Although the change was a reaction to Cooper's case, the legislature made it clear that the change did not affect Cooper's death sentence. In 1988, a Supreme Court decision, Thompson v. Oklahoma, barred the death penalty for defendants under the age of 16 at the time of the crime. The Indiana Supreme Court considered both of these developments, and the court heard arguments and reduced Cooper's sentence to life imprisonment on July 3, 1989.

A New York Times editorial that month called the court's decision "brave" and said that the law on which her death sentence was based was "medieval" as it allowed the execution of children as young as 10.

Aftermath
Cooper earned a GED and took college correspondence courses while in prison. Although she was sentenced to 60 years, Indiana law dictates that offenders earn one day off from their sentence for each day served with good behavior.

Pelke's grandson, Bill Pelke, initially favored the death penalty for Cooper but later joined the movement opposing it in 1987. He wrote of having forgiven Cooper in a 2003 book, Journey of Hope.

After serving 26 years, three weeks, and three days, Cooper was released on 17 June 2013. She was 43 at the time of her release. Just under two years later, on 26 May 2015, she was found dead of an apparent suicide, having shot herself in the head.

References

External links
Offender Data for Paula Cooper #864800 from the Indiana Department of Correction web site

1985 in Indiana
1985 murders in the United States
History of Gary, Indiana
Murder committed by minors
Murder in Indiana
May 1985 crimes
Female murder victims
History of women in Indiana